Yefremkasinskoye Rural Settlement (Yountapa jal tărăkhĕ) is an administrative and municipal division (a rural settlement) of Alikovsky District of the Chuvash Republic, Russia. It is located in the central part of the district. Its administrative center is the rural locality (a village) of Yefremkasy. Rural settlement's population: 2,608 (2006 est.).

Yefremkasinskoye Rural Settlement comprises thirteen rural localities.

The Cheboksary–Vurnary highway crosses the territory of the rural settlement.

References

Notes

Sources

Further reading
L. A. Yefimov, "Alikovsky District" ("Элӗк Енӗ"), Alikovo, 1994.
"Аликовская энциклопедия" (Alikovsky District's Encyclopedia), authors: Yefimov L. A., Yefimov Ye. L., Ananyev A. A., Terentyev G. K. Cheboksary, 2009, .

External links
Official website of Yefremkasinskoye Rural Settlement 



Alikovsky District
Rural settlements of Chuvashia